Surrender is the second EP from Philadelphia's Paint It Black. It was released by Fat Wreck Chords on August 18, 2009. It was released as a 7" single and a digital download. It is the second of two EPs the band released in 2009.

Track listing
 "Sacred" – 1:47
 "Worms" – 2:17
 "Cipher" – 0:46
 "Surrender" – 2:02

Personnel
Dan Yemin – vocals, guitar
Josh Agran – guitar
Andy Nelson – bass guitar, vocals
Jared Shavelson – drums

References

Paint It Black (band) albums
2009 EPs
Albums produced by Kurt Ballou
Fat Wreck Chords EPs